Yuldybay (Yuldıbay) is a rural locality (a village) and the administrative centre of Yuldybayevsky Selsoviet, Kugarchinsky District, Bashkortostan, Russia. The population was 276 as of 2010. There are 6 streets.

Geography 
Yuldybay is located 15 km southeast of Mrakovo (the district's administrative centre) by road. Novokhvalynsky is the nearest rural locality.

References 

Rural localities in Kugarchinsky District